The 31st Primetime Emmy Awards were held on Sunday, September 9, 1979. The ceremony was broadcast on ABC. It was hosted by Henry Winkler and Cheryl Ladd.  This ceremony is remembered for problems with the Pasadena Civic Auditorium's air-conditioning, as well as for Taxi's Outstanding Comedy Series victory.

The top shows of the night were Taxi, which pulled an upset in the Outstanding Comedy Series field when it beat All in the Family's final season. Lou Grant received 12 major nominations, which, it won two awards including Outstanding Drama Series.

For the first time, most of the miniseries and Television movie categories were merged into one, this would become the standard for later ceremonies, culminating with the TV Movie and Miniseries program categories combining in 2011. For this year only, the comedy and variety categories were combined in acting, directing, and writing. This combination would not stick, and the traditional categories returned the next year.

Winners and nominees

Programs

Acting

Lead performances

Supporting performances

Directing

Writing

Most major nominations
By network 
 CBS – 46
 ABC – 30
 NBC – 23

 By program
 Lou Grant (CBS) – 12
 M*A*S*H (CBS) – 9
 Backstairs at the White House (CBS) – 8
 All in the Family (CBS) / The Rockford Files (NBC) / Roots: The Next Generations (ABC) – 6

Most major awards
By network 
 ABC – 11
 CBS – 9
 NBC – 3

 By program
 All in the Family (CBS) / Friendly Fire (ABC) / The Jericho Mile (ABC) / Lou Grant (CBS) / Roots: The Next Generations (ABC) / Taxi (ABC) – 2

Notes

References

External links
 Emmys.com list of 1979 Nominees & Winners
 

031
1979 television awards
1979 in California
September 1979 events in the United States